Eric Chatfield (26 November 1900 – 27 February 1985) was an Australian rules footballer who played with Fitzroy in the Victorian Football League (VFL).

Notes

External links 
		

1900 births
1985 deaths
Australian rules footballers from Victoria (Australia)
Fitzroy Football Club players